Junius Brutus Booth Jr. (December 22, 1821 – September 17, 1883) was an American actor and theatre manager.

As a member of the illustrious Booth family of actors, Junius Brutus Booth Jr. was overshadowed by his father Junius Sr. and brothers Edwin and John Wilkes (the assassin of Abraham Lincoln) and later by his wife Agnes, a successful actress.

Booth was married three times: first briefly to Clementina De Bar, sister of comedian and theatrical manager Ben De Bar; then in California to Harriet Mace, who died giving birth to a daughter; and finally, upon returning East in 1867 and becoming manager of the Boston Theatre, to Agnes Perry (née Rookes), who thereafter was known professionally as Agnes Booth. Junius and Agnes had four children together: Junius Brutus III (1868–1912), Algernon (1869–1877), Sydney (1873–1937), and Barton (1874–1879). Only two survived to adulthood, and of those two, Junius Brutus III committed suicide in 1912.

Booth managed the Boston Theatre, Walnut Street Theatre, Winter Garden Theatre, and Booth's Theatre, where his brother Edwin was the star attraction. Though a relatively undistinguished actor, Junius Jr. was highly regarded for his performances as King John and as Cassius in Julius Caesar. In 1864 he performed Julius Caesar alongside his brothers Edwin (as Brutus) and John Wilkes (as Mark Antony).

Junius Brutus Booth Jr. himself was briefly imprisoned in Washington, D.C., after his brother assassinated Abraham Lincoln.  At the time of the assassination, he was fulfilling an acting engagement at Pike's Opera House in Cincinnati. Booth left Cincinnati by train on April 17 and arrived in Philadelphia on April 19. Booth notified the U.S. Marshal of his presence in the city and was arrested and hurried by train to the Old Capitol Prison, where he was interrogated and released.

Booth retired in 1881 to Masconomo House in Manchester-by-the-Sea, Massachusetts, where he died on September 17, 1883. He was buried in Manchester's Rosedale Cemetery. Although Agnes Booth remarried in 1885, she continued performing under the Booth name, and was buried next to him when she died in 1910.

References

External links 

1821 births
1883 deaths
19th-century American male actors
American male stage actors
American theatre managers and producers
American people of English descent
American prisoners and detainees
Junius Brutus Jr.
Burials in Massachusetts
19th-century American businesspeople